The Battle of Asculum was fought in 89 BC during the Social War between Rome and its former Italian allies. The Romans were led by C. Pompeius Strabo, and were victorious over the rebels. The future Consul Publius Ventidius was said to have been captured as a youth at this battle and displayed in a Triumph at Rome.

After two years of siege by the Romans, the people of Asculum, tired of the situation, decided to surrender against the wish of their leader Gaius Vidacilius, who, preferring to die with honour and with his freedom, burned himself in a temple in the town.

When the Roman Legions won the battle and entered the city, they destroyed all, burning houses and temples and killing the majority of the population. Their actions were meant to punish the city for its rebellion.

Publius Ventidius, a child when the city was destroyed, was captured by Pompeius Strabo and conducted to Rome as a prisoner. He was educated like a Roman soldier and became a consul, fighting against the Parthian Empire and winning. He also met and became a trusted friend of Julius Caesar.

References

Asculum 89 BC
Asculum (89 BC)
Asculum (89 BC)
1st century BC in the Roman Republic
1st century BC in Italy
Ascoli Piceno